Kim Anderson  was born and raised in Ottawa, Ontario.  Her parental grandmother, Catherine Anne Sanderson (b.1902) was the granddaughter of the Métis voyageur, Thomas Sanderson. Her parental grandfather, James E. Anderson (b.1899), came from a long line of marriages among Indigenous peoples spanning over five generations. Kim Anderson's work in educational tourism, community-based education, and cross cultural education afforded her many travels in her youth. But, when became a mother in 1995, she began to research and write about motherhood and culture-based understandings of Indigenous womanhood.

Kim Anderson is an associate professor at the University of Guelph, and is affiliated with the Department of Family Relations and Human Development in the College of Social and Applied Human Sciences. Anderson is an Indigenous (Metis) scholar with a research focus on Indigenous mothering, Indigenous feminism, Indigenous masculinities, and Indigenous knowledge in urban settings. She holds the Canada Research Chair in Indigenous Relationships, and leads a research team exploring the Indigenous concept of “all my relations" - an Indigenous expression of gratitude and connection - and how these relationships are developed and maintained among urban Indigenous populations.

She received her PhD in history from the University of Guelph in 2010, where her doctoral work focused on the role of Anishinaabek life stage teachings among northern Algonquin women as a site for Indigenous peoples to decolonise and construct healthier futures. Her M.A. is in Adult Education and Sociology and Equity Studies from University of Toronto's Ontario Institute for Studies in Education, and she earned an Honours B.A. as an English Specialist from the University of Toronto as well.

Anderson has also worked as a consultant for Indigenous organizations and communities for twenty years.

Career 
Anderson joined the Department of Family Relations and Applied Nutrition at University of Guelph in 2017 and earned a Canada Research Chair in Indigenous Relationships in 2018 that runs through 2023. She aims to "Indigenize the campus" through a range of programs including language training, food and medicine gardens on campus, and ceremonial spaces.

Anderson has published multiple single- and co-authored books, including: 
A Recognition of Being: Reconstructing Native Womanhood (2d Edition, Canadian Scholars, 2016) 
Life Stages and Native Women: Memory, Teachings and Story Medicine (University of Manitoba Press, 2011)
Indigenous Men and Masculinities: Legacies, Identities, Regeneration (with Robert Alexander Innes; University of Manitoba Press, 2015)
Mothers of the Nations: Indigenous Mothering as Global Resistance, Reclaiming and Recovery (with Dawn Lavell- Harvard; Demeter Press, 2014)
Life Stages and Native Women (University of Manitoba Press, 2011). ISBN 9780887557262

Editorial Contributions 

 Injichaag: My Soul in Story: Anishinaabe Poetics in Art and Words (University of Manitoba Press, 2019). 
 

Prior to joining the faculty at University of Guelph, Anderson served as associate professor in Indigenous Studies at Wilfrid Laurier University from 2011 to 2016. In much of her work, Anderson has engaged in collaborative community research and programming, such as the "Biidwewidam Indigenous Masculinities" project that received a SSHRC Partnership Development Grant in 2014 and involved the Ontario Federation of Indian Friendship Centres (OFIFC) and the Native Youth Sexual Health Network (NYSHN) to build "research capacity around Indigenous masculinities and identities with the intent of contributing to the health and wellness of Indigenous communities and peoples."

Activism and Formation of Kika'ige Historical Society 
Anderson co-founded the Kika'ige Historical Society, a professional performance art group dedicated to upsetting settler narratives while privileging Indigenous ways of knowing and history. The Kik'aige Historical Society was formed when Anderson and Lianne Leddy protested the installation of a statue of Sir John A. McDonald at Wilfrid Laurier University in 2015. The two dressed in prisoner's uniforms and sat beneath the Sir John A. McDonald protest for several days. The Kika'ige Historical Society has also contested Canadian confederation's silencing of Indigenous histories with the "Grannies of Confederation" painting.

References

Living people
Year of birth missing (living people)
Place of birth missing (living people)
University of Guelph alumni
Academic staff of the University of Guelph
Canadian anthropologists
Canadian women anthropologists
Canadian indigenous women academics
First Nations women
First Nations academics
Algonquian culture